Luo Yang may refer to:

Luo Yang (aircraft designer), Chinese aircraft designer (1961–2012)
Luo Yang (photographer), Chinese photographer (born 1984)
Luoyang, city in Henan, China